Swapping refers to the exchange of two or more things. For example, in programming data may be swapped between two variables, or things may be swapped between two people.

Swapping may specifically refer to:
 In computer systems, an older form of memory management, similar to paging
 Swapping (barter)
 Hot swapping
 Book swapping
 Wife swapping
 Cumswapping
 Clothes swapping

See also 
 Swap (disambiguation)

it:Baratto#Il baratto su internet